Mehran Feyzemamdoust (born November 23, 2001, in Rasht) is an Iranian volleyball player who plays for the Iranian national youth team and Iranian national team and Iranian club Paykan Tehran

Honours

National team
U19 World Championship
 Gold (1): 2017
U21 World Championship 
 Gold (1): 2019

References

External links

2001 births
Living people
Iranian men's volleyball players
People from Rasht
Sportspeople from Gilan province